The 15th Cruiser Squadron also known as Force K   was a formation of cruisers of the British Royal Navy from 1940 to 1946.

History
The squadron was formed in May 1940 and was assigned to the Home Fleet. In 1941 it was transferred to the Mediterranean Fleet where it remained for the duration of World War II. In May 1941 it served in the Battle of Crete, with its ships dispersed into several different Forces. For the duration of the battle, Rear Admiral Edward L. S. King was given command of Force C, which comprised a mixture of cruisers and destroyers. On 17 December 1941 the squadron was involved in the First Battle of Sirte against the Regia Marina (Italian Navy). On 22 March 1942 the squadron was involved in the Second Battle of Sirte against the Italian Fleet. Between 12 and 16 June 1942 it took part in Operation Vigorous. From 22 January to 5 June 1944 the squadron provided support during the Battle of Anzio. In June 1946 it was re-designated the 1st Cruiser Squadron.

Commodore/Rear/Vice-Admiral Commanding
Included:

References

Footnotes

Sources
  Mackie, Gordon. (2018) "Royal Navy Senior Appointments from 1865" (PDF). gulabin.com. Gordon Mackie.
  O'Hara, Vincent P. (2012). In Passage Perilous: Malta and the Convoy Battles of June 1942. Bloomington, Indiana, USA: Indiana University Press. .
  Pearson, Robert (2015). Gold Run: The Rescue of Norway's Gold Bullion from the Nazis, 1940. Casemate. .
  Thomas, David A. (1999). Malta Convoys 1940-42: The Struggle at Sea. Barnsley, England: Pen and Sword. .
  Watson, Dr Graham. (2015) "Royal Navy Organization in World War 2, 1939-1945: Overseas Commands and Fleets". www.naval-history.net. Gordon Smith.

Cruiser squadrons of the Royal Navy
Military units and formations of the Royal Navy in World War II